Chiaroscuro is the second studio album by Swedish duo I Break Horses. It was released in January 2014 under Bella Union.

Track list

References

2014 albums
Bella Union albums
I Break Horses albums